José da Cruz Marinho (born 18 September 1959) more commonly known as Zequinha Marinho is a Brazilian politician, as well as a pedagogist, accounting technician, and pastor. Although born in Tocantins, he has spent his political career representing Pará, having served as federal deputy from 2003 to 2015 and federal senator since 2019.

Personal life
Marinho graduated from Universidade do Estado do Pará and has worked is a pedagogist and an accounting technician prior to entering politics. He is married to Júlia Marinho, who herself is a politician. Marinho is a pastor of the Assembleias de Deus church.

Political career
Marinho voted in favor of the impeachment against then-president Dilma Rousseff. Marinho voted in favor of the Brazil labor reform (2017), and would later back Rousseff's successor Michel Temer against a similar impeachment motion.

In the 2018 election Marinho was one of 6 new evangelical politicians elected to the federal senate.

References 

1959 births
Living people
People from Tocantins
Members of the Legislative Assembly of Pará
Members of the Chamber of Deputies (Brazil) from Pará
Members of the Federal Senate (Brazil)
Brazilian Assemblies of God pastors
Brazilian Democratic Movement politicians
Social Christian Party (Brazil) politicians
Liberal Party (Brazil, 2006) politicians